Harold Glenn Dunaway (October 7, 1933 – September 3, 2012)  was an American stock car and sprint car driver. He made one start in the NASCAR Grand National Series.

Early and personal life
A native of Mecklenburg County, North Carolina, he was the son of racer Glenn Dunaway. Dunaway fought in the Korean War, serving in the United States Air Force. He was a certified private pilot and scuba diver. He was married, to Frances, and had two children.

Racing career
Dunaway was known as a North Carolina dirt track racer; he competed in NASCAR's Grand National Series, in a single race in 1966 at North Carolina Motor Speedway, driving a Plymouth and finishing 40th in a field of 44 cars. He later moved to sprint car racing, becoming a Dixie Outlaw Sprint Car Series competitor. He also competed several times in the Permatex 300, a Late Model Sportsman Division race that was run at Daytona International Speedway as a support race to the Daytona 500.

References

External links
 

1933 births
2012 deaths
NASCAR drivers
People from Mecklenburg County, North Carolina
Racing drivers from Charlotte, North Carolina
Racing drivers from North Carolina
United States Air Force airmen